Oravský Podzámok is a village and municipality in Dolný Kubín District in the Zilina Region of northern Slovakia. Orava Castle is located in the village.

The village is located at 508 m (1677 ft) and has a population of 1331 inhabitants.

Factory OFZ, Istebné, the largest Slovak producer of ferroalloys, is located in Oravský Podzámok.

Twin towns – sister cities

Oravský Podzámok is twinned with:
 Lipinki, Poland
 Vodňany, Czech Republic
 Włodowice, Poland

References

External links
 Oravský Podzámok village website (in Slovak)

Villages and municipalities in Dolný Kubín District